The Daytona Stakes is a Grade III American Thoroughbred horse race for horses three years old and older run over the distance of about  furlongs on the downhill turf scheduled annually in late May at Santa Anita Park in Arcadia, California.

History

The event was inaugurated in 1968 as the San Simeon Handicap

The race has been run at a variety of distances and track surfaces. The race was originally run on the dirt but in 1980 was switched to the downhill turf course. Since that time, it has only been run on dirt when the turf course was unusable due to weather-related conditions. Due to course conditions, several runnings of the event were taken off the turf and run on the dirt track.

The event was upgraded to a Grade III event for 1984.

In 2013 the race was renamed to the San Simeon Stakes.

The event was originally scheduled in April but the Los Angeles Turf Club in 2017 moved the race to the Memorial Day weekend at Santa Anita. In that same year the Los Angeles Turf Club renamed the race to the current name of Daytona Stakes.
The original Daytona Stakes was renamed to the San Simeon Stakes. The event was named after the Irish bred horse Daytona who a three year old won the Grade 1 Hollywood Derby and a four year old won the Grade I Shoemaker Mile Stakes at Santa Anita.

In 2019, the distance was shortened by over a furlong, and the event started on the backstretch of the turf oval. In 2020 the event was extended to  furlongs and in 2021 the event was held over  furlongs.

Records
Speed  record:
about  furlongs – 1:11:28  Chips All In (2013)

Margins:
 lengths – Century's Envoy  (1975)

Most wins:
 2 - Mr. Gruff (2009, 2010)
 2 - Champagne Bid (1984, 1985)

Most wins by an owner:
 2 - Elmendorf Farm (1976, 1981)
 2 - Saddle Hill Farm (1984, 1985)
 2 - Juddmonte Farms (1989, 2003)
 2 - Gary Broad (2009, 2010)
 2 - Hronis Racing (2014, 2022)

Most wins by a jockey:
 6 - Laffit Pincay, Jr. (1969, 1970, 1976, 1978, 1982, 1983)

Most wins by a trainer:
 6 - Ron McAnally (1973, 1976, 1977, 1981, 1990, 2007)

Winners

Legend:

 
 

Notes:

§ Ran as an entry

ƒ Filly or Mare

See also
List of American and Canadian Graded races

References

Horse races in California
Santa Anita Park
Graded stakes races in the United States
Turf races in the United States
Flat horse races for four-year-olds
Open sprint category horse races
Recurring sporting events established in 1968
Grade 3 stakes races in the United States